Peng may refer to:

 Peng (surname) (彭), a Chinese name
 Peng (state) (大彭), a state during the late Shang dynasty
 Peng (mythology) (鵬), a legendary Chinese creature
 Peng!, 1992 album by Stereolab
 PENG!, a 2005 comic
 P.Eng., commonly abbreviation in Canada for the regulated designation Professional Engineer
 Peng Collective, an art activist group combining investigative journalism, campaigning and theatre
 PenG, an antibiotic

See also 
 Pang (disambiguation)
 Pong (disambiguation)
 Ping (disambiguation)
 Penge, London